The Appalachian hemlock–northern hardwood forest is a forest system found in the Appalachian Mountains of New Hampshire, Vermont, Massachusetts, Connecticut, New York, New Jersey, Pennsylvania, Maryland, Virginia, West Virginia and western North Carolina. These forests occur in deep coves, moist flats, and ravines.

Flora
Appalachian hemlock–northern hardwood forests include yellow birch (Betula alleghaniensis), mountain maple (Acer spicatum), sugar maple (Acer saccharum), and beech (Fagus grandifolia). These trees often form a deciduous canopy, but are sometimes mixed with hemlock (Tsuga canadensis) or white pine (Pinus strobus). Other common trees include oaks (most commonly red oak (Quercus rubra)), tulip tree (Liriodendron tulipifera), black cherry (Prunus serotina), and sweet birch (Betula lenta).

Mountain laurel (Kalmia latifolia), hophornbeam (Ostrya virginiana), and rhododendron (Rhododendron spp.) are found in the understory.

Fauna 
The Appalachian Mountains are home to a vast population of white-tailed deer, which number in the millions and are found across the region. Because white-tailed deer are so prolific, extensive, and plentiful, the Appalachian Mountains have become a hotspot prized by white-tailed deer hunters. Eastern grey squirrels, eastern chipmunks, eastern cottontails, and woodchucks are other common small animals found in the Appalachian Mountains, and they are preyed upon by larger mammals such as Eastern American red foxes, eastern coyotes, American black bears, bobcats, and fishers. Many organizations are planning to reintroduce the elk back into its extirpated habitat, where they already established populations in parts of Pennsylvania. 

Birds are a crucial part of the Appalachian Mountains and multiple species call the Appalachians home, such species include American robins, mallards, eastern wild turkeys, northern cardinals, Canada geese, and American goldfinches.

Adjacent transitions
In the north this forest type is replaced by Laurentian–Acadian pine–hemlock–hardwood forest and Laurentian–Acadian northern hardwood forest.

See also
 Northern hardwood forest

References

Temperate broadleaf and mixed forests in the United States
Ecoregions of the United States

Appalachian forests
Plant communities of the Eastern United States
Forests of the United States